Jon Stephen Lindsay (born 4 December 1935) 
is a Republican former member of the Texas Senate, having represented the 7th District from 1997 to 2007.

He was succeeded in 2007 by fellow Republican Dan Patrick, who would later be elected as Lieutenant Governor of Texas.

Considered a Moderate Republican, Lindsay was from 1975 to 1995 the county judge of Harris County. He defeated incumbent judge, Bill Elliott in 1974. He did not seek reelection in 1994 and was succeeded as county judge by fellow Republican Robert Eckels.

Election history

Most recent election

2002

Previous elections

2000

1996

References

External links
 Lindsay, Jon and Louis Marchiafava. Jon Lindsay Oral History, Houston Oral History Project, September 23, 1975.

|-

1935 births
Living people
Politicians from Santa Fe, New Mexico
People from Harris County, Texas
Republican Party Texas state senators
County judges in Texas
21st-century American politicians